Tullidge is a surname. Notable people with the surname include:

Edward Tullidge (1829–1894), American literary critic, newspaper editor, playwright, and historian 
John E. Tullidge (1806–1873), American music critic, musician, and hymnwriter